Hwang Hyo-sook (born May 3, 1979), better known by her stage name Lexy (Hangul: 렉시), is a South Korean singer and rapper who debuted in 2003 under YG Entertainment. She was the first solo female rap artist to debut under the company.

Career

2003-present: Career beginnings, YG Entertainment and debut album
Lexy has been featured in songs with many other YG artists, such as Se7en, 1TYM, Jinusean and Wheesung. She was marketed by YG as a hip-hop artist with a little mix of R&B vibe as well. Her debut album, LEXURY (released on October 6, 2003), was fairly well received and with her growing popularity she became a rival with popular singer Lee Hyori for a while. Though her debut album was well received, her second album Lextacy (released on August 26, 2005) didn't achieve as much commercial success when it was released and due to the poor sales it prompted a decision by YG Entertainment to not renew her contract. It was mutually decided that there wouldn't be a re-signing of her contract, but they still wanted to carry out the third album. Titled RUSH, it was released on April 18, 2007, and was on the charts for a few weeks, thanks to her title song "Above The Sky", but the album sales were still not as strong as her debut album.

On September 12, 2007, when Yang Hyun Suk announced that Lexy left YG Entertainment, as signing with the agency did not happen, he also revealed that because of that, he felt like he was giving away his younger sister for marriage. Lexy's contract actually ended in October 2006. There has been no problems on money or ill-feelings toward both parties. It was just decided they would go on separate ways.

On Lexy's first album, LEXURY, Teddy Park of 1TYM composed the song "Let Me Dance" and Song Baek Kyoung, also from 1TYM, composed the song "Up And Down".

After transferring to SB&W Entertainment (joint venture of Sony BMG (now Sony Music) & now-defunct SK Telecom subsidiary WiderThan), Lexy released a new album, THE LEXY, featuring few hip hop artists such as Crown J and VOS. The album consisted of different music style by Lexy going more on the electronic hip hop genre, plus ballads and jazz and was released on March 24, 2008.

In February 2012, Lexy blogged about her return to the music industry and her scheduled 6th album release in August.

Discography

Studio albums

Singles

Participation in albums

Music videos

Awards

Mnet Asian Music Awards

References

External links 
 
 LEXY website

1979 births
Living people
South Korean women rappers
21st-century South Korean women singers
21st-century South Korean singers
South Korean female idols